Weekend AM (stylised as Weekend:am) is an Irish morning television show on Virgin Media One, that was first broadcast as "Saturday AM" on 29 August 2015 at 09:00, with "Sunday AM" beginning the following day.

Development
Following the success of Ireland AM and an absence of live breakfast television on the weekends, the TV3 Group (now Virgin Media Television) confirmed in June 2015, it would introduce a weekend slot to its schedule.

It was confirmed Ireland AM presenter Anna Daly would move to the new weekend slot and present alongside Ivan Yates and Laura Woods. The show broadcasts between 09:00 to 12:00 each Saturday and Sunday. The programme features news, current affairs, weather updates and analysis of the weekend newspapers with in-studio guests.

On 30 August 2018, to coincide with the rebranding of TV3 to "Virgin Media One", Ireland AM launched a new set, and the Saturday and Sunday editions of the programme were renamed as "Weekend AM".

From the week starting 7 October 2019, Ireland AM started airing 7 days a week, meaning Weekend AM rebranded to Ireland AM.

Presenters
Anna Daly (2015–2021)
Simon Delaney (2015–2021)
Laura Woods (2015–2021)
Aidan Power co-host and sport (2019–2021)

News and weather
Geraldine Lynagh
Anne O'Donnell
Former presenters
Tommy Martin (2015–2018)
Ivan yates (2015)

References

External links
 

1999 Irish television series debuts
2000s Irish television series
2010s Irish television series
Irish television talk shows
Virgin Media Television (Ireland) original programming